Year 1451 (MCDLI) was a common year starting on Friday (link will display the full calendar) of the Julian calendar.

Events 
 January–December 
 January 7 – Pope Nicholas V issues a Papal Bull to establish The University of Glasgow; classes are initially held in Glasgow Cathedral.
 February 3 – Murad II, Sultan of the Ottoman Empire, dies and is succeeded (on February 18) by his son, Mehmed II.
 February 14 – Louis XI of France marries Charlotte of Savoy.
 April 11 – Celje acquires market town status and town rights, by orders from Count Frederic II of Celje.
 April 19 – In the Delhi Sultanate, the Afghan Lodi Dynasty succeeds the Turkish Sayyid Dynasty.
 June 30 – French troops under Jean de Dunois invade Guyenne, and capture Bordeaux.
 August 20 – The French capture Bayonne, the last English stronghold in Guyenne.
 October – After assassinating Bogdan II of Moldavia, Petru Aron takes up the throne. 
 October 28 – Revolt of Ghent: Ghent takes up arms against Philip the Good, Duke of Burgundy.

 Date unknown 
 The Great Peacemaker along with Jigonhsasee and Hiawatha, found the Haudenosaunee, commonly called the Iroquois Confederacy

Births 

 January 14 – Franchinus Gaffurius, Italian composer (d. 1522)
 January 29 – John, Prince of Portugal, Prince of Portugal (d. 1451)
 February 17 – Raffaello Maffei, Italian theologian (d. 1522)
 March 5 – William Herbert, 2nd Earl of Pembroke, English earl (d. 1491)
 March 9 – Amerigo Vespucci, Italian explorer (d. 1512)
 April 22 – Queen Isabella I of Castile, Castillian queen regnant and first queen of a united Spain (by marriage to Ferdinand of Aragon) (d. 1504)
 May 2 – René II, Duke of Lorraine (d. 1508)
 May 17 – Engelbert II of Nassau, Count of Nassau-Vianden and Lord of Breda (1475–1504) (d. 1504)
 June 1 – Giles Daubeney, 1st Baron Daubeney (d. 1508)
 July 10 – James III of Scotland (d. 1488)
 September 5 – Isabel Neville, Duchess of Clarence, elder daughter of Richard Neville (d. 1476)
 November 29 – Elisabeth of Brandenburg, Duchess of Württemberg (d. 1524)
 date unknown
 Christopher Columbus, Italian explorer (d. 1506)
 Ignatius Noah of Lebanon, Syriac Orthodox patriarch of Antioch (d. 1509).

Deaths 

 January 7 – Antipope Felix V (b. 1383)
 January 18 – Henry II, Count of Nassau-Siegen, Co-ruler of Nassau-Siegen (1442–1451) (b. 1414)
 February 3 – Murad II, Ottoman Sultan (b. 1404)
 June – ‘Abdullah, Timurid Empire ruler
 July 11 – Barbara of Cilli, Holy Roman Empress, queen consort of Hungary and Bohemia (b. 1392)
 October – Bogdan II of Moldavia, assassinated by Petru Aron
 date unknown
 Stefan Lochner, German painter (b. 1400)
 John Lydgate, English monk and poet (b. 1370)
 al-Mustakfi II, Abbasid Caliph

References